is a Japanese voice actress from Osaka, Japan. After standing in for Kotono Mitsuishi, the voice of Usagi Tsukino in the series Sailor Moon, when she had appendicitis, Araki was given the role of Chibiusa in the same series. While training at a voice acting school, Araki acted as senpai to fellow voice actress Konami Yoshida, and they have since maintained a close relationship.

Early life 
She was born in Osaka Prefecture. She moved to Hokkaido in second grade, to Kagawa Prefecture in the third grade and Kadoma in Osaka and Tomakomai in Hokkaido in the fourth grade. Due to the work of her father, she moved seven times before graduating from high school.

Since childhood, she longed for the theater world due to the influence of television. She didn't want to be the main actress and just wanted to play. She decided to follow the theatrical path in the fall of the third year of high school.

Career 
After finishing high school in Hokkaido, she moved to Tokyo to become a stage actress. She entered the training school of the Tokyo Actor's Consumer's Cooperative Society (Haikyō) and enrolled in the acting department for half a year. She joined the theater company because she could not get into the upper class on the advanced exam. Her voice work began after she was discovered by a voice actor office manager who saw Araki on stage. Her first anime work was Maison Ikkoku. After that, Araki affiliated with Ken Production. Instead of voice work, the NHK reporter and scene moderators focused mainly on face-to-face work. She then transferred to Arts Vision, where animation was the main focus.

In 1993, she played the main character Usagi Tsukino in the Sailor Moon anime series, for 7 episodes replacing Kotono Mitsuishi who was hospitalized. The scheduled required a substitute and Araki was selected. Later, in the sequel to the series, she played Sailor Chibi Moon. Her role was decided without an audition. In 1995, she played Miaka Yūki in Fushigi Yûgi, her first leading role in television animation.

She was affiliated with 81 Produce from August 2003 to May 2010 and currently is freelancing.

Filmography

Anime

Television
{{columns-list|colwidth=30em|
Mobile Suit Gundam 0083: Stardust Memory (1991–1992) as Jacqueline Simone
Mischievous Twins: The Tales of St. Clare's (1991) as Sheila NeiraArmored Police Metal Jack (1991) as Sayuri KamizakiChikyū SOS Sore Ike Kororin (1992) as Ozon EkoSailor Moon (1992–1997) as Usagi Tsukino (eps. 44–50), ChibiusaYAWARA! Special: Zutto Kimi no Koto ga… (1992) as MarusōTama of 3rd Street: Do You Know My Tama? (1993) as KomaLittle Women II: Jo's Boys (1993) as DaisyMobile Suit Victory Gundam (1993) as Peggy LeeMobile Fighter G Gundam (1994) as Cath RonaryBonobono (1995) as Chirabi-chanGunsmith Cats (1995–1996) as "Minnie" May HopkinsFushigi Yûgi (1995) as Miaka YūkiMobile Suit Gundam Wing (1995) as Hilde Schbeiker, Schoolgirl GFushigi Yûgi (1996–2002) series as Miaka YūkiRemi, Nobody's Girl (1996) as MariaMysterious Thieft Saint Tail (1996) as Sayaka Kodocha (1996–1998) as ShizuFlame of Recca (1997) as YōkoGestalt (1997) as ŌriPocket Monsters (1997) as Natsume (Sabrina)Slayers Try (1997) as AnnaCardcaptor Sakura (1998–2000) as AkaneLet's Nupu Nupu (1998) as Hamster / Kyouzame-chan / Mari-chanSuper Radical Gag Family (1998) as Noriko NishikawaBomberman B-Daman Bakugaiden V (1999) as Mermaid BonCorrector Yui (1999–2000) as Ai ShinozakiDigimon Adventure (1999) as Hikari YagamiGreat Teacher Onizuka (1999–2000) as Nagisa NagaseIketeru Futari (1999) as Akira KoizumiMedabots (1999) as NadakoMonster Rancher (1999) as MichelleShin Hakkenden (1999) as TamazusaCeres, Celestial Legend (2000) as Shōta KurimaDigimon Adventure 02 (2000) as Hikari YagamiHand Maid May (2000) as Chigusa TaniDoki Doki♡Densetsu Mahōjin Guru Guru (2000) as Juju Kū ShunamuruGo! Go! Itsutsugo Land (2001) as Kodama MorinoDigimon Frontier (2002) as PatamonHungry Heart Wild Striker (2002-2003) as Kaori DoumotoMirmo! (2002) as Otome, MarinaRahXephon (2002) as Cathy McMahonAshita no Nadja (2003) as Simone MonterranGilgamesh (2003) as Reiko YushiroZoids: Fuzors (2003) as RebeccaGuardian Hearts (2003) as Maya ŌbaYu-Gi-Oh! Duel Monsters GX (2004–2008) as Maiden of the AquaGuardian Hearts: Power Up! (2005) as Maya ŌbaLove Com (2007) as Mimi Yoshioka

}}

FilmMobile Suit Gundam 0083: The Last Blitz of Zeon (1992) as Jacqueline SimoneI Can Hear the Sea (1993) – Yumi KohamaPretty Soldier Sailor Moon R The Movie (1993) – ChibiusaPretty Soldier Sailor Moon S The Movie (1994) – ChibiusaPretty Soldier Sailor Moon SuperS: The Nine Sailor Soldiers Unite! Miracle of the Black Dream Hole (1995) – ChibiusaDigimon Adventure'' (1999) – Hikari Yagami

Video games

Dubbing

References

Notes

External links
Kae Araki at GamePlaza-Haruka Voice Acting Database 
Kae Araki at Hitoshi Doi's Seiyuu Database

1963 births
Living people
Arts Vision voice actors
Japanese video game actresses
Japanese voice actresses
Ken Production voice actors
Voice actresses from Hokkaido
Voice actresses from Osaka
Voice actors from Kagawa Prefecture
20th-century Japanese actresses
21st-century Japanese actresses
81 Produce voice actors